The Gabor Medal is one of the medals awarded by the Royal Society for "acknowledged distinction of interdisciplinary work between the life sciences with other disciplines".

The medal was created in 1989 to honor the memory of physicist Dennis Gabor, and was originally awarded biennially. Initially awarded "for acknowledged distinction of work in the life sciences, particularly in the fields of genetic engineering and molecular biology", the criteria for the awarding of the medal were later changed to its current definition. It is made of silver. The medal is targeted at "emerging early to mid career stage scientist[s]" and is accompanied by a £2000 prize since 2017. Before that, it accompanied with a prize of £1000. From 2017 it has been awarded annually. All citizens who have been residents of either United Kingdom, Commonwealth of Nations, or the Republic of Ireland for more than three years are eligible for the medal.

The Gabor Medal was first awarded in 1989 to Noreen Murray for her pioneering work in genetic engineering. As of February 2022, the latest recipient of the Gabor Medal is Peter Donnelly.

List of recipients

See also 
Awards, lectures and medals of the Royal Society

References

External links 
 

Awards of the Royal Society
Awards established in 1989
1989 in biology
Biennial events